Mother Riley Meets the Vampire, also known as Vampire Over London or My Son, the Vampire,  is a 1952 British horror comedy film directed by John Gilling, starring Arthur Lucan and Bela Lugosi that was filmed at Nettlefold Studios.

This was the final film of the Old Mother Riley film series, and did not feature Lucan's wife and business partner Kitty McShane, from whom he had separated in 1951. The film was later released in the U.S. in 1963 as My Son, the Vampire.

Plot
Von Housen seeks to dominate the world from his headquarters in London with an army of 50,000 radar-controlled robots that are powered by uranium. He believes himself to be a vampire and has several young women abducted, most recently Julia Loretti, who has a map to a uranium mine that he needs for his robot army.

At the moment, Von Housen only has one functional robot which is supposed to be shipped to him but, through a mistake, is shipped to Old Mother Riley's store instead, with Mother Riley's package sent to Von Housen. Seeing Mother Riley's address in the label, Von Housen sends his robot to abduct Mother Riley and take her to his headquarters.

Cast
Arthur Lucan as Old Mother Riley
Bela Lugosi as Von Housen
María Mercedes as Julia Loretti
Dora Bryan as Tilly
Philip Leaver as Anton Daschomb
Richard Wattis as PC Freddie
Graham Moffatt as the yokel
Roderick Lovell as Douglas
David Hurst as Mugsy
Judith Furse as Freda
Ian Wilson as Hitchcock, the butler
Hattie Jacques as Mrs. Jenks
Dandy Nichols as Mrs. Mott
Cyril Smith as Mr. Paine, the rent collector
Lawrence Naismith as police sergeant
Bill Shine as Mugsy's assistant
John Le Mesurier as Scotland Yard officer (uncredited)

Production
On the suggestion of producer Richard Gordon, Bela Lugosi had travelled to the UK to appear in a stage play of Dracula, which failed. He needed money to return to the US. Gordon persuaded fellow producer George Minter to use Lugosi in a movie in London. Arthur Lucan had starred in a sequence of Old Mother Riley movies and it was felt that Lugosi's presence in the cast might give it a chance of success outside Britain.

Lugosi was paid $5,000 for his role. The plot was taken from Abbott and Costello Meet Frankenstein.

Gordon says that although John Gilling was credited as producer, George Minter was the real producer. Filming took four weeks.

Richard Gordon recalled that there were plans to shoot additional scenes with Lugosi and without Arthur Lucan for the American market, but the idea was never put into motion.

Gordon also stated that the film emphasised that Lugosi's character was not a real vampire so that it would get a U certificate allowing children, who were Old Mother Riley's biggest audience, to see it.

Lucan's understudy Roy Rolland stood in for him in the more physical stunts in the film.

Release
Mother Riley Meets the Vampire was released in the United Kingdom in July 1952. The film was not a success in the box-office and was not released in the US until 1963.

The American distributors originally planned to retitle the film Vampire Over London, and prints do exist with that title, although it is not clear if they were ever distributed. 

Later it was to have been changed to Carry On, Vampire for its American release but Anglo-Amalgamated (the producers of the popular British Carry On film series) successfully sued, with the title finally being changed to My Son, the Vampire as a tie-in to American comedian Allan Sherman's My Son, the Folksinger hit comedy record. It featured an introductory sequence with a song by Allan Sherman called "My Son, the Vampire".

Lugosi was offered the lead in a proposed 1953 sequel to the Mother Riley film produced by J. Arthur Rank, on the condition that Lugosi had to travel back to England to appear in it, but he was too ill to travel. Producer Alex Gordon proposed inserting newly filmed Hollywood footage of Lugosi into the 1951 film to create an extended version of it to be titled King Robot, but that project was also abandoned since by 1953, Lugosi's physical appearance failed to match the earlier footage of himself.

Reception
From a contemporary reviews, a reviewer in the Monthly Film Bulletin dismissed the film, simply declaring it "Stupid, humourless and repulsive."

Notes

References
 Frank J. DelloStritto and Andi Brooks, Vampire Over London: Bela Lugosi in Britain (Cult Movies Pr; 1st Edition, September 2000)

External links

 

1952 films
1952 horror films
1950s comedy horror films
Films directed by John Gilling
British comedy horror films
1952 comedy films
British black-and-white films
1950s English-language films
1950s British films